Omar Rodríguez-López is a multi-instrumentalist, songwriter, producer, actor and director, who is best known for his roles as band leader of The Mars Volta and guitarist for At the Drive-In. He is also the former bassist of the dub outfit De Facto, punk band Le Butcherettes (for which he also serves as producer), and finally, an active member of Bosnian Rainbows, Antemasque, and Crystal Fairy (band). Omar has released an eclectic catalogue of music as a solo musician and has collaborated with a diverse range of artists and bands, such as El-P, Faust, John Frusciante, Lydia Lunch, Red Hot Chili Peppers and Damo Suzuki.

This article represents the complete body of work released by Omar Rodríguez-López as a solo musician and record producer.

Albums

Studio albums

As Omar Rodriguez Lopez

As Omar Rodriguez Lopez Quartet

As El Grupo Nuevo de Omar Rodriguez Lopez

As El Trío de Omar Rodriguez Lopez

As Omar Rodriguez Lopez & John Frusciante

As Omar Rodriguez Lopez & Jeremy Michael Ward

Live albums

As Omar Rodriguez Lopez Group

Compilation albums

As Omar Rodriguez Lopez

Extended plays

As Omar Rodriguez-Lopez & Damo Suzuki

As Omar Rodriguez Lopez & Lydia Lunch

As Faust & Omar Rodriguez Lopez

As Kimono Kult

Singles

As Nadie

As Omar Rodriguez Lopez & John Frusciante

Other appearances

As producer

Videography

Music videos

Rodriguez Lopez Productions catalog
RLP001 Cryptomnesia
RLP002 Our Delicate Stranded Nightmare (by Zechs Marquise)
RLP003 Xenophanes
RLP004 Solar Gambling
RLP005 Los Sueños de un Hígado
RLP006 Ciencia de los Inútiles
RLP007 Sepulcros de Miel
RLP008 Octahedron (by The Mars Volta) - vinyl only
RLP009 Omar Rodriguez-Lopez & John Frusciante
RLP010 Un Escorpión Perfumado
RLP011 N/A
RLP012 Sin Sin Sin (by Le Butcherettes)
RLP013 Cizaña de los Amores
RLP014 Tychozorente
RLP015 N/A
RLP016 N/A
RLP017 N/A
RLP018 Mantra Hiroshima
RLP019 Dōitashimashite
RLP020 N/A
RLP021 Telesterion
RLP022 N/A
RLP023 Getting Paid (by Zechs Marquise)
RLP024 Before Gardens After Gardens (by Big Sir)
RLP025 Noctourniquet (by The Mars Volta) - vinyl only
RLP026 Un Corazón de Nadie
RLP027 Octopus Kool Aid
RLP028 Saber, Querer, Osar y Callar
RLP029 Touch But Don't Look (by Deantoni Parks)
RLP030 The Sentimental Engine Slayer

See also

Antemasque discography
At the Drive-In discography
Bosnian Rainbows discography
De Facto discography
Le Butcherettes discography
The Mars Volta discography
Omar Rodríguez-López filmography

References

External links
El Groupo Nuevo de Omar Rodriguez Lopez at Rodriguez Lopez Productions
Omar Rodriguez Lopez at Rodriguez Lopez Productions
[ Omar Rodríguez-López] at Allmusic

 
Rock music discographies
Discographies of American artists